Scelotrichia is a genus of insects belonging to the family Hydroptilidae.

Species:
 Scelotrichia asgiriskanda (Schmid, 1958)
 Scelotrichia bercabanghalus Wells & Malicky, 1997
 Scelotrichia kakatu Wells, 1990

References

Hydroptilidae
Trichoptera genera